Events from the year 1602 in Sweden.

Events

Births

 18 February - Per Brahe the Younger, Privy Councillor   (born 1680)

Deaths

 - Valpuri Innamaa, merchant and shipowner

References

 
Years of the 17th century in Sweden
Sweden